Too Young to Be in Love is the first studio album from American punk rock band Hunx and His Punx. It was released in 2011 under Hardly Art Records.

Track listing

Personnel
Hunx and His Punx
 Seth Bogart (Hunx) – Guitar, organ, vocals
 Erin Emalie – Vocals, drums
 Shannon Shaw – Vocals, bass
 Michelle Santamaria – Vocals, lead guitar
 Amy Blaustein – Guitar, organ, vocals

Others
 Produced and mastered by Ivan Julian
 Art by Hunx
 Photos by Amos Mac, painted by Brande Bytheway and Hunx

References

2011 albums
Hunx and His Punx albums